Gibbula rifaca is a species of sea snail, a marine gastropod mollusk in the family Trochidae, the top snails.

Description
The height of the shell attains 3.5 mm, its diameter 5 mm. The  sublenticular shell is, wax colored, with irregular blotchings and spottings of very pale chestnut brown. The upper surface is depressed and has a helicoid shape. The nucleus consists of a little more than one whorl, which is well rounded and smooth. The 3½ postnuclear whorls are marked by strongly incised spiral lines, causing the space between them to appear as raised, well rounded spiral cords on the first two postnuclear whorls and as broad flattened cords on the last whorl. Eight of these spiral cords appear on the first, seven on the second, while on the last turn 12, including the peripheral cord, appear between the periphery and the summit. Those nearest the periphery on this whorl are much narrower than on the posterior portion of the whorl. The sutures are well marked. The periphery of the body whorl is very strongly angulated. The base of the shell is very short, slightly concave, broadly, openly umbilicated, and marked by 12 depressed, rounded spiral cords of somewhat varying width. The entire surface of the shell is marked by slender lines of growth which extend over the base and into the umbilicus. The large aperture is very oblique. The thin outer lip shows the external sculpture within. The inner lip is almost vertical, sinuous, reflected over and appressed to the preceding whorl.

Distribution
This marine species occurs off Port Alfred, South Africa.

References

rifaca
Gastropods described in 1915